How the Grinch Stole Christmas! (also known as Dr. Seuss' How the Grinch Stole Christmas!) is a 1966 American animated television special, directed and co-produced by Chuck Jones. It is based on the 1957 children's book of the same name by Dr. Seuss, and tells the story of the Grinch, who tries to ruin Christmas for the townsfolk of Whoville below his mountain hideaway. Originally telecast in the United States on CBS on Sunday, December 18, 1966, it went on to become a perennial holiday special. The special features the voice of Boris Karloff as the Grinch and the narrator.

Plot 
The Grinch is a surly asocial green creature with a heart "two sizes too small" who lives alone in a snowbound cave atop Mt. Crumpit, located above the village of Whoville. He especially hates Christmas and has always been annoyed by the town's Christmas celebrations. One Christmas Eve, he finally decides to stop Christmas Day from coming to Whoville by disguising himself as Santa Claus, his dog Max as a reindeer and, in a reversal of Santa's visit, stealing all presents, decorations, and symbols of Christmas. Once loaded, he plans on dumping the bags of stolen goods. He is noticed by a girl named Cindy Lou Who, but is otherwise undetected.

As the Grinch reaches the icey summit of Mt. Crumpit, ready to dump the bags, he discovers that the citizens of Whoville, despite having no gifts or decorations, have gathered in the middle of town to sing as Christmas Day dawns. Realizing that Christmas means more than just material possessions, the Grinch's heart grows three sizes. He saves the sleigh, returns the presents and the other belongings to the Whos, and joins in the town's Christmas celebration, by carving the roast beast, and Max gets the first slice.

Voice cast 
 Boris Karloff as the Grinch / Narrator
 June Foray as Cindy Lou Who
 Dallas McKennon as Max
 Thurl Ravenscroft as Vocalist
 MGM Studio Chorus as Citizens of Whoville

Credits 
 Produced by Chuck Jones and Ted Geisel
 Directed by Chuck Jones
 The Songs: 
 Lyrics by Dr. Seuss 
 Music by Albert Hague
 Additional Music and Orchestra by Eugene Poddany
 Production Design: Maurice Noble
 Animation: Ben Washam, Ken Harris, Lloyd Vaughan, Richard Thompson, Don Towsley, Tom Ray and Philip Roman
 Layouts: Oscar Dufau and Don Morgan
 Backgrounds: Philip DeGuard, Bob Inman and Hal Ashmead
 Graphics: Don Foster
 Additional Story: Irv Spector and Bob Ogle
 Co-Director: Ben Washam
 Editors: Lovell Norman and John Young
 Production Manager: Earl Jonas
 Production Executive: Les Goldman

Production 
Director Chuck Jones and children's-book author Ted Geisel (Dr. Seuss) had worked together on the Private Snafu training cartoons at Warner Bros. Cartoons during World War II. Jones was interested in adapting one of Geisel's books into a television special and approached him to turn How the Grinch Stole Christmas! into one in time for the holiday season. Although Geisel was initially reluctant due to his unpleasant experiences making the film The 5,000 Fingers of Dr. T., he eventually agreed. How the Grinch Stole Christmas! was produced by The Cat in the Hat Productions in association with the television and animation divisions of Metro-Goldwyn-Mayer Studios, where Jones was under contract at the time. CBS, coming off the surprise success of A Charlie Brown Christmas a year before, allotted Jones and MGM a $315,000 budget (around $2,465,000 in 2018), more than four times what Bill Melendez was offered to produce A Charlie Brown Christmas.

Jones questioned how to make a Christmas special without the typical elements (orthodox religion, Santa, etc.). Jones' answer: "Write our new carols in Seussian Latin. After all, 'Fahoofores, Dahoodores' seems to have as much authenticity as 'Adeste fideles' to those unauthored in Latin." The song "Trim Up the Tree" was written in a square-dance type form by Albert Hague. Due to Cindy Lou Who's appealing cute design, Jones redesigned her as seeming to be the great-granddaughter of the Grinch in appearance, reluctantly having her role pared down, which broke Jones' heart. The character Max was set up as an observer and victim, and, according to the animation director, in the same way as Porky Pig and Daffy Duck in Duck Dodgers or Robin Hood Daffy. The special required eleven to fourteen months of production time, 15,000 drawings and cels, 250 background layout drawings, 1,200 character layout drawings, and 60 musicians working for 8 hours to finish the special.

The original broadcast was sponsored by the Foundation for Full Service Banks, whose sponsor plugs within the original airing were later edited out for subsequent broadcasts. The entirety of the book's text, with some slight embellishment, was adapted into the special; to pad the special to a full 30-minute time slot, songs and animated sequences without words (the longest being an extended scene in which the Grinch and Max comically descend into Whoville) were added. As all the major networks had flipped to full color schedules by 1966, the special was likewise produced in color, establishing the Grinch's color (white in the two-tone illustrations of the original book) as green, a convention used in later television specials featuring the character as well as the 2000 live-action and 2018 3D animated film adaptations.

Broadcast 
The half-hour (with commercials) short was originally telecast in the United States on CBS on December 18, 1966. CBS repeated it annually during the Christmas season until 1988. It was then seen multiple times per year on Turner-owned properties – first TNT, then TBS, and then Cartoon Network – and The WB returned it to broadcast television by adding its own annual screening in 2001. ABC took over the special after The WB ceased operations in 2006. NBC acquired the rights in 2015; its deal with Warner Bros. allows two broadcasts per season, currently scheduled for the night after Thanksgiving  and Christmas night. The Christmas night broadcast has been later followed by the airing of the 2000 film of the same name. In 2022 the second airing of the special was aired on December 23 instead of Christmas Day due to an NFL game between the Tampa Bay Buccaneers and Arizona Cardinals. TBS and TNT both continue to air the special annually many times during the holiday season.

Reception 
The special was released in the midst of a wave of animated holiday specials, joining a number of other 1960s productions (such as 1964's Rudolph the Red-Nosed Reindeer, 1965's A Charlie Brown Christmas, 1968's The Little Drummer Boy, 1969's Frosty the Snowman, and 1970's Santa Claus Is Comin' to Town) that have come to be regarded as classics; critic Rick Du Brow compared it favorably to those specials at the time, saying it was "probably as good as most of the other holiday cartoons."

The critical consensus on Rotten Tomatoes, which gives the special a 100% approval rating, reads: "How the Grinch Stole Christmas brings an impressive array of talent to bear on an adaptation that honors a classic holiday story – and has rightfully become a yuletide tradition of its own." The special continues to be popular in Nielsen Ratings, with its 2010 airing (the last of many times it had aired that year) winning its time slot among persons 18 to 49 and finishing second in overall viewers. TV Guide ranked the special No. 1 on its 10 Best Family Holiday Specials list. Fatherly included the special on its list of the 100 best family-friendly films widely available to the public, one of only two productions made for television (A Charlie Brown Christmas being the other).

Home media 
How the Grinch Stole Christmas! was released to VHS, Betamax, CED, and LaserDisc by MGM/UA Home Video in the 1980s, and was reissued several times. The special was released to the VHS and DVD formats in 1999 and 2000 by Warner Home Video, which acquired the rights to the MGM library in the late 1990s via their purchase of Turner Entertainment. MGM had earlier released it on DVD in 1997. The 1997 DVD release featured another Seuss-based special, Horton Hears a Who!, while the 2000 DVD also added an audio commentary by lead animator Phil Roman and June Foray, interviews with Albert Hague and Thurl Ravenscroft, and the "Special Edition" documentary which aired alongside the special on TNT in 1994. The DVD was well-received for these bonus features, but also criticized for its sub-par picture quality; many critics pointed out that the Grinch looked yellow, not green, in this release.

The special was re-released on DVD in 2006 and labeled as a "50th Birthday Deluxe Edition". That labeling refers to the 1957 date of the book's publication rather than to the date of the 1966 TV special. This DVD release featured a new retrospective featurette and contained all the bonus features from the previous release, except for the audio commentary, and the Grinch was restored to his original green color. This edition is also available as part of the four-disc Classic Christmas Favorites box set. The special was again re-released on DVD with Phil Roman's and June Foray's audio commentary replacing the Horton Hears a Who! bonus special. The special was released on high definition Blu-ray Disc in 2009 with the title changed to Dr. Seuss' How the Grinch Stole Christmas!. It contained all the bonus features from the 2000 DVD, except for Horton Hears a Who!, and also included a DVD of the special and a Digital Copy. On October 18, 2011, It featured on the Dr. Seuss: Holidays On The Loose! DVD set, along with Halloween Is Grinch Night and The Grinch Grinches the Cat in the Hat.

Soundtrack 
Three songs with lyrics were included in the special: "Welcome Christmas", "Trim up the Tree" and "You're a Mean One, Mr. Grinch". The last of these was performed by Thurl Ravenscroft; the other two were performed by a chorus representing the voices of the Whos. None of the vocalists were credited at the time.

On December 18, 1966, MGM released a soundtrack LP in conjunction with the television special. CD releases include albums produced by Island (1995) and Mercury Records. In the recorded version, Boris Karloff does all voices including Cindy Lou Who. The song "You're a Mean One, Mr. Grinch", which comically describes the level of the Grinch's despicable nature, includes all verses with their original rhyming lyrics and the isolated song tracks have different durations due to being re-recorded.

On October 5, 1999, Rhino Entertainment released a new CD soundtrack (which included the soundtrack for another Dr. Seuss cartoon, Horton Hears a Who!). Both story collections contain selected dialogue and music numbers. The "isolated music tracks" in this edition are taken directly from the television soundtrack and are not the re-recorded tracks from earlier versions. The dialogues are the originals, being voiced by Boris Karloff for "Grinch" and Hans Conried for "Horton".

Because Thurl Ravenscroft was not credited in the closing credits of the 1966 television special as singing the song "You're a Mean One, Mr. Grinch", it is sometimes attributed to Boris Karloff. After becoming aware of this oversight, Seuss himself called Ravenscroft and apologized profusely and later wrote letters to columnists nationwide telling them that it was Ravenscroft who provided vocals for the musical number. Ravenscroft would become a staple in several of Seuss's later television specials, voicing one of the Wickersham Brothers in Horton Hears a Who and a factory worker in The Lorax. Karloff received a Grammy Award in the Spoken Word category—the only major performing award of his career—for the album.

Prequels and follow-ups 
A television special called Halloween Is Grinch Night, created by DePatie–Freleng Enterprises, aired on ABC in 1977, eleven years after the Christmas special. This special involved a tale of the Grinch coming down to haunt the Whos every Halloween. Though less successful than the original, it was awarded an Emmy. A later cartoon, The Grinch Grinches the Cat in the Hat (alternatively titled The Cat in the Hat Gets Grinched), aired on ABC in 1982. Though credited to DePatie–Freleng, it was produced by Marvel Productions, which had taken over DePatie–Freleng in 1981.

See also 
 The Grinch (film)
 How the Grinch Stole Christmas (2000 film)
 Grammy Award for Best Album for Children
 List of Christmas films

References

Sources

External links 

 Official Warner Bros. Site
 
 

1966 films
CBS television specials
1966 television specials
1960s American television specials
1960s animated television specials
Christmas television specials
Musical television specials
Television shows written by Dr. Seuss
Dr. Seuss television specials
Television shows directed by Chuck Jones
Films scored by Eugene Poddany
The Grinch (franchise)
American Christmas television specials
Animated Christmas television specials
Criticism of the commercialization of Christmas
MGM Animation/Visual Arts television specials
Short films directed by Ben Washam